Sarindar Dhaliwal (born 1953) is a Canadian multi-media artist, based in Toronto.

Biography
Dhaliwal was born in the Punjab, and moved with her family to England at the age of four and grew up in Southall, London. At the age of fifteen, she migrated again with her family to Canada and settled down on a farm near Brampton, Ontario. Finding it challenging to adapt to small-town life, she worked to save up for a trip back to London, where she stayed for a year.

She received a BA in Fine Art at Falmouth University, Cornwall in England (1978), then moved back to Canada where she still lives. She gained a MA from York University, Toronto in 2003. Subsequently, she earned a Ph.D in Cultural Studies from Queen's University in Kingston, Ontario.

Dhaliwal's Art

Dhaliwal's work is narrative-based, exploring issues of cultural identity, and includes installation, printmaking, collage, painting and video projection. Much of Dhaliwal's work deals with memory – specifically childhood memories. Dhaliwal's art tells the story of her life as a global citizen by cleverly exploring the complex relationships between memory and place,  language and colour, sport and ritual, family and society, and the histories of colonialism and migration focusing on racism, conflict, and identity. As a result, Dhalwal's art is simultaneously personal and universal, defying all attempts at categorization.

the green fairy story book (bookwork with table, 2010)  is influenced by Dhaliwal's love of colour which she developed in childhood from reading fairy stories in colourful books at the library. Southall:Childplay (chromira print, 2009) covers an entire wall with her own collection of coloured pencils, which she used to play with.  In When I grow up I want to be a namer of paint colors (mixed media on graph paper, 2010), Dhaliwal gives names to colours: crushed raspberry, Indian summer, burnt persimmon.  Dhaliwal's love of colour is also evident in the glowing colours of 28 ambassador cars (chromira print,  2010) driving around an island of text.

It was Dhaliwal's own lived experience of racism in the West that nurtured her love of colour.  However, all colors are equal for her. In Corner Flags and Corner Shops (mixed media installation, 2013) depicting a racist incidence even on the soccer field, she paints in multicoloured butterflies on white paper, to point out that colours are natural and racism is not a part of nature.

Dhaliwal's videowork olive, almond and mustard (2010) depicts her childhood memory of growing up in Britain having her long black hair washed with white yoghurt and oiled and braided by her mother. This piece moves back and forth from India to Britain with nursery rhymes,  Bollywood film music, English pop songs and BBC Radio news describing her immigrant childhood in Great Britain.

The cartographer's mistake: the Radcliffe Line (chromira print, 2012) depicts the partition of the Indian subcontinent in Marigold flowers.  Marigolds are traditionally a symbol of welcome but here they set the country afire.  In 1947, Cyril Radcliffe was charged with carving  up the subcontinent into 2 countries on the basis of religion: India and Pakistan. Even today, people are still writing and talking about the nightmare of partition.

Exhibitions
Dhaliwal has exhibited her work at many major Canadian public galleries, including The Edmonton Art Gallery and the Agnes Etherington Art Centre, Ontario. She is represented in the Centre for Contemporary Canadian Art. An exhibition of her work, 'Record Keeping', toured Britain in 2004, showing at the John Hansard Gallery (Southampton), Oriel Mostyn Gallery (Wales)and at Canada House Gallery (London). Her work is in collections including Canada Council Art Bank and the Walter Phillips Gallery at The Banff Centre for the Arts.

Dhaliwal's most recent solo shows were in 2013 at A Space Gallery, an artist-led space in Toronto and at the Surrey Art Gallery in Surrey, BC; Gallerie Deste in Montreal (2010) and the Robert Langen Art Gallery in Waterloo (2012). In 2011 she participated in exhibitions in Stony Plain, Alberta, the Art Gallery of Greater Victoria and the Reach, Abbotsford both in British Columbia and at the Vadehra Art Gallery in Delhi, India. Sarindar Dhaliwal was the 2012 recipient of the Canada Council International Residency at Artspace, Sydney, Australia.

In November 2016, Dhaliwal's work was featured as part of the Koffler Art Gallery's exhibit Yonder. The show dealt with work surrounding the Canadian immigrant experience.

List of solo exhibitions
 1983 – Images de St. Pierre et Michelon, Le Centre Français, Kingston, Ontario
 1984 – Des fruits et des triangles, Le Chambre Blance, Quebec City, Quebec
 1985 – Recent Works, Kingston Public Library, Kingston, Ontario
 1987 – St. Lawrence College Gallery, Kingston, Ontario
 1989 – Laurentian University Museum and Arts Centre, Sudbury, Ontario
 1989 – Art Noise, Kingston, Ontario
2004–2005 – Record Keeping, organized and circulated by the Organization for Visual Arts and Agnes Etherington Art Centre, touring to John Hansard Gallery, Southampton UK, Oriel Mostyn Gallery (now MOSTYN), Llandudno Wales, Canada House Gallery, London, UK, and Agnes Etherington Art Centre, Kingston, Ontario
2012 – the Cartographer's mistake: Hockey Fields and Marigold Maps, Robert Langen Art Gallery, Waterloo, Ontario
2013 – the cartographer's mistake: Southall and other places, A Space Gallery, Toronto, Ontario
2013 – Sarindar Dhaliwal: Narratives from the Beyond, Surrey Art Gallery, Surrey, British Columbia
2015–2016 - The Radcliffe Line and Other Geographies, Organized and Circulated by Rodman Hall Art Centre/Brock University, touring also to The Reach Gallery Museum, Abbtosford, British Columbia, Canada, and Robert McLaughlin Gallery, Oshawa, Ontario, Canada.

List of selected group exhibitions
 1985 – Artforms, Kitchener-Waterloo Gallery, Kitchener, Ontario
 1985 – Rodnam Hall Arts Centre, St. Catharines, Ontario
 1985 – A Change in the Weather, K.A.A.I. Gallery, Kingston, Ontario (two-person show)
2011–2012 – Collected Resonance: Shelly Bhal, Sarindar Dhaliwal, Farheen HaQ, Art Gallery of Greater Victoria, Victoria, British Columbia
2015 – Traversive Territories: Sarindar Dhaliwal, Soheila Esfahani, Colette Urban, Varley Art Gallery, Markham, Ontario
2016 – Yonder, Koffler Gallery, Toronto
2018 – India Contemporary Photographic and New Media Art, FotoFest 2018 Biennial (Asia Society Texas Center, Houston, Texas)
2018–2019 – Vision Exchange: Perspectives from India to Canada, organized and circulated by the National Gallery of Canada and the Art Gallery of Alberta, touring also to the Art Museum at the University of Toronto and the Winnipeg Art Gallery

Awards
 1983 – Aprons (installation), MacDonald Park, Kingston, Ontario
 1983 – Ministry of Culture Artist in the Community Award
 1982, 1984 – Ontario Arts Council, Artist in the Schools Programme
 1983–1986 – Ontario Arts Council, Materials Assistance Grant 
 1987 – Canada Council, Explorations Grant

References

External links
 Artfacts
Canadian Art Magazine
 Art Sync
La Presse
http://ccca.concordia.ca/academy/papers_PDFs/8-stephanie/Stephanie3.pdf 
http://www.jstor.org/stable/pdf/42616590.pdf?seq=1#page_scan_tab_contents

1953 births
Living people
Alumni of Falmouth University
British women artists
British multimedia artists
Punjabi artists
Canadian women artists
Women artists from Punjab, India